The Bedroom Window is a 1987 American neo-noir psychological thriller film directed by Curtis Hanson. It stars Steve Guttenberg, Elizabeth McGovern and Isabelle Huppert, and was shot in Baltimore in the Mt. Vernon neighborhood. Based on a novel The Witnesses, by Anne Holden, it tells the story of a young executive who starts an affair with the wife of his boss which then escalates into nightmare after he lies to the police in order to protect her.

Plot
Terry (Steve Guttenberg) asks his boss' wife Sylvia (Isabelle Huppert) to his apartment after an office party and the two go to bed. Later, while he is in the bathroom, she hears screams outside and goes naked to the window. Seeing a man attacking a young woman, she opens the window and the assailant runs away. When the media report the murder of a young woman near Terry's flat that night, he thinks the police should know what Sylvia saw but, to protect her, claims that it was he who was at the bedroom window.

At a police lineup, neither he nor the victim Denise (Elizabeth McGovern) is able to pick out the attacker, Chris. Despite the feeble evidence against him, Chris is put on trial for the assault and during the proceedings his lawyer proves that since Terry is short-sighted he could not have witnessed the incident. Chris goes free, leaving not only the police and the prosecution but also Denise and Sylvia aghast at Terry's ineptness.

In the courtroom, Chris recognised Sylvia as the woman at the window. Desperate to warn her, Terry finds her at a ballet performance and tells her she must go to the police, but she refuses all further involvement. As he leaves, he sees Chris's distinctive truck parked outside and rushes in again. He is too late, however, for in the dark she has been stabbed fatally and dies in Terry's arms.

He takes refuge with Denise, who first seduces him and then offers him a chance to redeem himself. She wants revenge, and with him devises a plot to provoke Chris into another attack. Disguising herself, she goes to a bar where Chris is drinking and signals her availability. Terry follows her as she leaves to go home and, when Chris attacks, the two are able to repel him. He escapes, only to be caught by the police who Terry forewarned.

Cast
Steve Guttenberg as Terry Lambert
Elizabeth McGovern as Denise
Isabelle Huppert as Sylvia Wentworth
Paul Shenar as Collin Wentworth
Carl Lumbly as Det. Quirke
Frederick Coffin as Det. Jessup
Brad Greenquist as Chris Henderson
Wallace Shawn as Henderson's Attorney
Robert Schenkkan as State Attorney Peters
Maury Chaykin as Pool Player
 Sara Carlson as Dancing Girl
Mark Margolis as Man in Phone Booth
Jodi Long as Cocktail Waitress
 Richard K. Olsen as Late Night Shopper
Leon Rippy as Seedy Bartender
Kate McGregor-Stewart as Blowsy Neighbor

Production

Development
Curtis Hanson read the novel The Witness by Anne Holden and tried to get the film rights. They had been bought by Paramount who had them for 15 years. Hanson did a deal with the studio to write the script. His adaptation added the character of Denise, the assaulted waitress.

Casting
Hanson says Elizabeth McGovern was his "only choice" to play Denise. "Robert De Niro was obsessed with McGovern in Once Upon a Time in America. Dudley Moore was obsessed with her in Lovesick. So it's fun to have her play a part where her beauty is secondary. At a certain point she takes over the plot. She's the victim who becomes the aggressor."

In the script Sylvia was American but Hanson decided to cast Isabelle Huppert. "She gives the movie a little extra something," said Hanson. "Being French, she has a veneer of sophistication. She's glamorous and belongs to a world that he aspires to. Isabelle also added a contrast with Elizabeth, to whom Steve's character was initially unattracted."

Hanson says Steve Guttenberg was not his first choice for the lead of Terry but rather a suggestion of Dino De Laurentiis. "Dino thought that if the movie wasn't successful, at least he'd have a young person in the lead who is liked and is known for comedy," said Hanson.

Guttenberg was very enthusiastic to do the film and Hanson agreed to cast him after they had dinner together. "I thought the picture should have his enthusiasm and his humor," Hanson said. "Steve was dying to play the part. It was something different for him. He perceived his character as more of a leading man than a comedian."

Shooting
The film was shot in the Mount Vernon neighborhood of Baltimore, Maryland and in North Carolina at DeLaurentiis' DEG studios in Wilmington.

Music
The music for the film was composed by Michael Shrieve and Patrick Gleeson, and released as the official soundtrack album on LP in 1986.

Critical reception
Upon its original release, The Bedroom Window was met with a negative feedback by Vincent Canby in The New York Times. The film subsequently received mixed to mildly positive reviews from other film critics. James Berardinelli gave the film 2 out of 4 stars and called it "a promising thriller [gone] badly wrong". Jack Sommersby recommended it as "a first-rate thriller that only occasionally missteps", but reflected negatively on its story. Derek Armstrong described it as "a diligent, suspenseful thriller" with "a tense, focused story", pointing out, however, the inferiority of the third act to the rest of the film as well as loose plot threads.

As of April 2021, the film holds a 70% rating on Rotten Tomatoes based on 30 reviews with the consensus: "A likable cast and mostly solid story help The Bedroom Window transcend hollow Hitchcock pastiche."

See also
 Isabelle Huppert on screen and stage

References

External links

1987 films
1980s crime thriller films
1987 independent films
1980s psychological thriller films
American crime thriller films
American independent films
American thriller drama films
De Laurentiis Entertainment Group films
1980s English-language films
Films about adultery in the United States
Films about miscarriage of justice
Films based on crime novels
Films directed by Curtis Hanson
Films produced by Martha De Laurentiis
Films set in Baltimore
Films shot in Baltimore
Films shot in North Carolina
American rape and revenge films
American serial killer films
American neo-noir films
1980s American films